Albania competed at the 2022 Mediterranean Games held in Oran, Algeria from 25 June to 6 July 2022.

Medalists

Medals per Sport

Artistic gymnastics

Matvei Petrov competed in artistic gymnastics.

Athletics

Albania won one gold medal in athletics.

Track & road events
Men

Women

Boxing

Albania competed in boxing.

Judo

Albania competed in judo.

Men

Shooting

Albania competed in shooting.

Swimming

Albania competed in swimming.

Men

Women

Taekwondo

Albania competed in Taekwondo.

 Legend
 PTG — Won by Points Gap
 SUP — Won by superiority
 OT — Won on over time (Golden Point)
 DQ — Won by disqualification
 PUN — Won by punitive declaration
 WD — Won by withdrawal

Men

Tennis

Albania competed in tennis.

Men

Women

Weightlifting

Albania won one medal in weightlifting.

Men

Wrestling

Albania won two medals in wrestling.

Men's Freestyle

Men's Greco-Roman

References

Nations at the 2022 Mediterranean Games
2022
Mediterranean Games